J. H. Wilson is the name of:

James H. Wilson (American football) (1940–2013), American college football coach
James H. Wilson (1837–1925), American topographic engineer, a Union Army Major General in the American Civil War and later wars, a railroad executive, and author
John Hardie Wilson (1858–1920), Scottish botanist and photographer